Naftemporiki was founded in 1924 by brothers Panos and Giorgos Athanasiadis and it is the first financial newspaper in Greece.
As of April 7, 2021, the newspaper was acquired through an auction by businessman Dimitris Melissanidis for €7 million euros.

Takeover
April 7, 2021, Zofrank Holdings Co. owned by Greek businessman Dimitris Melissanidis acquired Naftemporiki for a fee of €7 million. Second highest bid was media company Alter Ego owned by Evangelos Marinakis, the bid was €3.8 million.

References

Newspapers established in 1924
1924 establishments in Greece
Greek-language newspapers
Newspapers published in Athens
Daily newspapers published in Greece